The 1922 Geneva Covenanters football team was an American football team that represented Geneva College as an independent during the 1922 college football season. Led by Robert Park in his first and only year as head coach, the team compiled a record of 4–6.

Schedule

References

Geneva
Geneva Golden Tornadoes football seasons
Geneva Geneva Covenanters football